

Events

Pre-1600
 796 – King Æthelred I of Northumbria is murdered in Corbridge by a group led by his ealdormen, Ealdred and Wada. The patrician Osbald is crowned, but abdicates within 27 days.
1428 – Peace of Ferrara between Republic of Venice, Duchy of Milan, Republic of Florence and House of Gonzaga: ending of the second campaign of the Wars in Lombardy fought until the Treaty of Lodi in 1454, which will then guarantee the conditions for the development of the Italian Renaissance.
1506 – The cornerstone of the current St. Peter's Basilica is laid.
1518 – Bona Sforza is crowned as queen consort of Poland.
1521 – Trial of Martin Luther begins its second day during the assembly of the Diet of Worms. He refuses to recant his teachings despite the risk of excommunication.

1601–1900
1689 – Bostonians rise up in rebellion against Sir Edmund Andros.
1738 – Real Academia de la Historia ("Royal Academy of History") is founded in Madrid.
1775 – American Revolution: The British advancement by sea begins; Paul Revere and other riders warn the countryside of the troop movements.
1783 – Three-Fifths Compromise: The first instance of black slaves in the United States of America being counted as three fifths of persons (for the purpose of taxation), in a resolution of the Congress of the Confederation. This was later adopted in the 1787 Constitution.
1831 – The University of Alabama is founded in Tuscaloosa, Alabama.
1847 – American victory at the battle of Cerro Gordo opens the way for invasion of Mexico.
1857 – "The Spirits Book" by Allan Kardec is published, marking the birth of Spiritualism in France.
1864 – Battle of Dybbøl: A Prussian-Austrian army defeats Denmark and gains control of Schleswig. Denmark surrenders the province in the following peace settlement.
1897 – The Greco-Turkish War is declared between Greece and the Ottoman Empire.
1899 – The St. Andrew's Ambulance Association is granted a royal charter by Queen Victoria.

1901–present
1902 – The 7.5  Guatemala earthquake shakes Guatemala with a maximum Mercalli intensity of VIII (Severe), killing between 800 and 2,000.
1906 – An earthquake and fire destroy much of San Francisco, California.
1909 – Joan of Arc is beatified in Rome.
1915 – French pilot Roland Garros is shot down and glides to a landing on the German side of the lines during World War I.
1916 – White war on the Italian front (World War I): during a mine warfare in high altitude on the Dolomites, the Italian troops conquer the Col di Lana held by the Austrian army.
1917 – The II Italian Corps in France leaves from Italy for the western front.  It will distinguish itself during the Third Battle of the Aisne and the Second Battle of the Marne, in Bligny and on the sector Courmas – Bois du Petit Champ, where it will considerably contribute to stop the German offensive on Eparnay, aimed to outflank Reims.
1930 – The British Broadcasting Corporation (BBC) announced that "there is no news" in their evening report.
1939 – Robert Menzies, who became Australia's longest-serving prime minister, is elected as leader of the United Australia Party after the death of Prime Minister Joseph Lyons.
1942 – World War II: The Doolittle Raid on Japan: Tokyo, Yokohama, Kobe and Nagoya are bombed.
  1942   – Pierre Laval becomes Prime Minister of Vichy France.
1943 – World War II: Operation Vengeance, Admiral Isoroku Yamamoto is killed when his aircraft is shot down by U.S. fighters over Bougainville Island.
1945 – Over 1,000 bombers attack the small island of Heligoland, Germany.
  1945   – Italian resistance movement: In Turin, despite the harsh repressive measures adopted by Nazi-fascists, a great pre-insurrectional strike begins.
1946 – The International Court of Justice holds its inaugural meeting in The Hague, Netherlands.
1947 – The Operation Big Bang, the largest non-nuclear man-made explosion to that time, destroys bunkers and military installations on the North Sea island of Heligoland, Germany.
1949 – The Republic of Ireland Act comes into force, declaring Éire to be a republic and severing Ireland "association" with the Commonwealth of Nations.
1954 – Gamal Abdel Nasser seizes power in Egypt.
1955 – Twenty-nine nations meet at Bandung, Indonesia, for the first Asian-African Conference.
1972 – East African Airways Flight 720 crashes during a rejected takeoff from Addis Ababa Bole International Airport in Addis Ababa, Ethiopia, killing 43.
1980 – The Republic of Zimbabwe (formerly Rhodesia) comes into being, with Canaan Banana as the country's first President. The Zimbabwean dollar replaces the Rhodesian dollar as the official currency.
1988 – The United States launches Operation Praying Mantis against Iranian naval forces in the largest naval battle since World War II.
  1988   – In Israel John Demjanjuk is sentenced to death for war crimes committed in World War II, although the verdict is later overturned.
2018 – King Mswati III of Swaziland announces that his country's name will change to Eswatini.
2019 – A redacted version of the Mueller report is released to the United States Congress and the public.

Births

Pre-1600
 359 – Gratian, Roman emperor (d. 383)
 588 – K'an II, Mayan ruler (d. 658)
 812 – Al-Wathiq, Abbasid caliph (d. 847)
1446 – Ippolita Maria Sforza, Italian noble (d. 1484)
1480 – Lucrezia Borgia, daughter of Pope Alexander VI (d. 1519)
1503 – Henry II of Navarre, (d. 1555)
1534 – William Harrison, English clergyman (d. 1593)
1580 – Thomas Middleton, English Jacobean playwright and poet (d. 1627)
1590 – Ahmed I, Ottoman Emperor (d. 1617)

1601–1900
1605 – Giacomo Carissimi, Italian priest and composer (d. 1674)
1666 – Jean-Féry Rebel, French violinist and composer (d. 1747)
1740 – Sir Francis Baring, 1st Baronet, English banker and politician (d. 1810)
1759 – Jacques Widerkehr, French cellist and composer (d. 1823)
1771 – Karl Philipp, Prince of Schwarzenberg (d. 1820)
1772 – David Ricardo, British economist and politician (d. 1823)
1794 – William Debenham, English founder of Debenhams (d. 1863)
1813 – James McCune Smith, African-American physician, apothecary, abolitionist, and author (d. 1865)
1819 – Carlos Manuel de Céspedes, Cuban lawyer and activist (d. 1874)
  1819   – Franz von Suppé, Austrian composer and conductor (d. 1895)
1838 – Paul-Émile Lecoq de Boisbaudran, French chemist and academic (d. 1912)
1854 – Ludwig Levy, German architect (d. 1907)
1857 – Clarence Darrow, American lawyer (d. 1938)
1858 – Dhondo Keshav Karve, Indian educator and activist, Bharat Ratna Awardee (d. 1962)
  1858   – Alexander Shirvanzade, Armenian playwright and author (d. 1935)
1863 – Count Leopold Berchtold, Austrian-Hungarian politician and diplomat, Joint Foreign Minister of Austria-Hungary (d. 1942)
  1863   – Linton Hope, English sailor and architect (d. 1920)
  1863   – Siegfried Bettmann, founder of the Triumph Motorcycle Company and Mayor of Coventry (d. 1955)
1864 – Richard Harding Davis, American journalist and author (d. 1916)
1874 – Ivana Brlić-Mažuranić, Croatian author and poet (d. 1938)
1877 – Vicente Sotto, Filipino lawyer and politician (d. 1950)
1879 – Korneli Kekelidze, Georgian philologist and scholar (d. 1962)
1880 – Sam Crawford, American baseball player, coach, and umpire (d. 1968)
1882 – Isaac Babalola Akinyele, Nigerian ruler (d. 1964)
  1882   – Leopold Stokowski, English conductor (d. 1977)
1883 – Aleksanteri Aava, Finnish poet (d. 1956)
1884 – Jaan Anvelt, Estonian educator and politician (d. 1937)
1889 – Jessie Street, Australian activist (d. 1970)
1892 – Eugene Houdry, French-American mechanical engineer and inventor (d. 1962)
1897 – Ardito Desio, Italian geologist and cartographer (d. 2001)
1898 – Patrick Hennessy, Irish soldier and businessman (d. 1981)
1900 – Bertha Isaacs, Bahamian teacher, tennis player, politician and women's rights activist (d. 1997)

1901–present
1901 – Al Lewis, American songwriter (d. 1967)
  1901   – László Németh, Hungarian dentist, author, and playwright (d. 1975)
1902 – Waldemar Hammenhög, Swedish author (d. 1972)
  1902   – Giuseppe Pella, Italian politician, 32nd Prime Minister of Italy (d. 1981)
1904 – Pigmeat Markham, African-American comedian, singer, and dancer (d. 1981)
1905 – Sydney Halter, Canadian lawyer and businessman (d. 1990)
  1905   – George H. Hitchings, American physician and pharmacologist, Nobel Prize laureate (d. 1998)
1907 – Miklós Rózsa, Hungarian-American composer and conductor (d. 1995)
1911 – Maurice Goldhaber, Ukrainian-American physicist and academic (d. 2011)
1914 – Claire Martin, Canadian author (d. 2014)
1915 – Joy Davidman, Polish-Ukrainian American poet and author (d. 1960)
1916 – Carl Burgos, American illustrator (d. 1984)
1918 – Gabriel Axel, Danish-French actor, director, and producer (d. 2014)
  1918   – André Bazin, French critic and theorist (d. 1958)
  1918   – Shinobu Hashimoto, Japanese director, producer, and screenwriter (d. 2018)
  1918   – Clifton Hillegass, American publisher, founded CliffsNotes (d. 2001)
  1918   – Tony Mottola, American guitarist and composer (d. 2004)
1919 – Virginia O'Brien, American actress and singer (d. 2001)
  1919   – Esther Afua Ocloo, Ghanaian entrepreneur and pioneer of microlending (d. 2002)
1920 – John F. Wiley, American football player and coach (d. 2013)
1921 – Jean Richard, French actor and singer (d. 2001)
1922 – Barbara Hale, American actress (d. 2017)
1924 – Clarence "Gatemouth" Brown, American singer-songwriter and guitarist (d. 2005)
1925 – Marcus Schmuck, Austrian mountaineer and author (d. 2005)
1926 – Doug Insole, English cricketer (d. 2017)
1927 – Samuel P. Huntington, American political scientist, author, and academic (d. 2008)
  1927   – Tadeusz Mazowiecki, Polish journalist and politician, Prime Minister of Poland (d. 2013)
1928 – Karl Josef Becker, German cardinal and theologian (d. 2015)
  1928   – Otto Piene, German sculptor and academic (d. 2014)
1929 – Peter Hordern, English soldier and politician
1930 – Clive Revill, New Zealand actor and singer
1931 – Bill Miles, American director and producer (d. 2013)
1934 – James Drury, American actor (d. 2020)
  1934   – George Shirley, African-American tenor and educator
1935 – Costas Ferris, Egyptian-Greek actor, director, producer, and screenwriter
1936 – Roger Graef, American-English criminologist, director, and producer (d. 2022)
  1936   – Vladimir Hütt, Estonian physicist and philosopher (d. 1997)
1937 – Keiko Abe, Japanese marimba player and composer
  1937   – Jan Kaplický, Czech architect, designed the Selfridges Building (d. 2009)
1939 – Glen Hardin,  American pianist and arranger
  1939   – Thomas J. Moyer, American lawyer and judge (d. 2010)
1940 – Joseph L. Goldstein, American biochemist and geneticist, Nobel Prize laureate
  1940   – Mike Vickers, English guitarist, saxophonist, and songwriter 
1941 – Michael D. Higgins, Irish sociologist and politician, 9th President of Ireland
1942 – Michael Beloff, English lawyer and academic
  1942   – Robert Christgau, American journalist and critic
  1942   – Jochen Rindt, German-Austrian racing driver (d. 1970)
1944 – Kathy Acker, American author and poet (d. 1997)
  1944   – Philip Jackson, Scottish sculptor and photographer
1945 – Bernard Arcand, Canadian anthropologist and author (d. 2009)
1946 – Hayley Mills, English actress 
1947 – Moses Blah, Liberian general and politician, 23rd President of Liberia (d. 2013)
  1947   – Jerzy Stuhr, Polish actor, director, and screenwriter
  1947   – James Woods, American actor and producer
1948 – Régis Wargnier, French director, producer, and screenwriter
1950 – Grigory Sokolov, Russian pianist and composer
1953 – Rick Moranis, Canadian-American actor, comedian, singer and screenwriter 
1954 – Robert Greenberg, American pianist and composer
1956 – Eric Roberts, American actor
1958 – Gabi Delgado-López, Spanish-German singer, co-founder of D.A.F. (d. 2020)
  1958   – Malcolm Marshall, Barbadian cricketer and coach (d. 1999)
1959 – Susan Faludi, American journalist, author and feminist
  1960   – Yelena Zhupiyeva-Vyazova, Ukrainian runner
1961 – Jane Leeves, English actress and dancer
  1961   – John Podhoretz, American journalist and author
1963 – Conan O'Brien, American television host, comedian, and podcaster
  1963   – Eric McCormack, Canadian-American actor
1964 – Niall Ferguson, Scottish historian and academic
1969 – Keith DeCandido, American author
1970 – Saad Hariri, Saudi Arabian-Lebanese businessman and politician, 33rd Prime Minister of Lebanon
1971 – David Tennant, Scottish actor 
1972 – Rosa Clemente, American journalist and activist
  1972   – Eli Roth, American actor, director, producer, and screenwriter
1973 – Haile Gebrselassie, Ethiopian runner
1981 – Audrey Tang, Taiwanese computer scientist and academic
1989 – Jessica Jung, South Korean-American singer, songwriter, actress, author, fashion designer and businesswoman

Deaths

Pre-1600
727 – Agallianos Kontoskeles, Byzantine commander and rebel leader
 850 – Perfectus, Spanish monk and martyr
 909 – Dionysius II, Syriac Orthodox patriarch of Antioch
 943 – Fujiwara no Atsutada, Japanese nobleman and poet (b. 906)
 963 – Stephen Lekapenos, co-emperor of the Byzantine Empire
1161 – Theobald of Bec, French-English archbishop (b. 1090)
1176 – Galdino della Sala, Italian archdeacon and saint
1430 – John III, Count of Nassau-Siegen, German count
1552 – John Leland, English poet and historian (b. 1502)
1555 – Polydore Vergil, English historian (b. 1470)
1556 – Luigi Alamanni, Italian poet and politician (b. 1495)
1567 – Wilhelm von Grumbach, German adventurer (b. 1503)
1587 – John Foxe, English historian and author (b. 1516)

1601–1900
1636 – Julius Caesar, English judge and politician (b. 1557)
1650 – Simonds d'Ewes, English lawyer and politician (b. 1602)
1674 – John Graunt, English demographer and statistician (b. 1620)
1689 – George Jeffreys, 1st Baron Jeffreys, Welsh judge and politician, Lord Chancellor of Great Britain (b. 1648)
1732 – Louis Feuillée, French astronomer, geographer, and botanist (b. 1660)
1742 – Arvid Horn, Swedish general and politician (b. 1664)
1763 – Marie-Josephte Corriveau, Canadian murderer (b. 1733)
1794 – Charles Pratt, 1st Earl Camden, English lawyer, judge, and politician, Lord Chancellor of Great Britain (b. 1714)
1796 – Johan Wilcke, Swedish physicist and academic (b. 1732)
1802 – Erasmus Darwin, English physician and botanist (b. 1731)
1832 – Jeanne-Elisabeth Chaudet, French painter (b. 1761)
1859 – Tatya Tope, Indian general (b. 1814)
1864 – Juris Alunāns, Latvian philologist and linguist (b. 1832)
1873 – Justus von Liebig, German chemist and academic (b. 1803)
1890 – Paweł Bryliński, Polish sculptor (b. 1814)
1898 – Gustave Moreau, French painter and academic (b. 1826)

1901–present
1906 – Luis Martín, Spanish religious leader, 24th Superior-General of the Society of Jesus (b. 1846)
1912 – Martha Ripley, American physician (b. 1843)
1917 – Vladimir Serbsky, Russian psychiatrist and academic (b. 1858)
1923 – Savina Petrilli, Italian religious leader (b. 1851)
1936 – Milton Brown, American singer and bandleader (b. 1903)
  1936   – Ottorino Respighi, Italian composer and conductor (b. 1879)
1938 – George Bryant, American archer (b. 1878)
1942 – Aleksander Mitt, Estonian speed skater (b. 1903)
  1942   – Gertrude Vanderbilt Whitney, American heiress, sculptor and art collector, founded the Whitney Museum of American Art (b. 1875)
1943 – Isoroku Yamamoto, Japanese admiral (b. 1884)
1945 – John Ambrose Fleming, English physicist and engineer, invented the vacuum tube (b. 1849)
  1945   – Ernie Pyle, American journalist and soldier (b. 1900)
1947 – Jozef Tiso, Slovak priest and politician, President of Slovakia (b. 1887)
1951 – Óscar Carmona, Portuguese field marshal and politician, 11th President of Portugal (b. 1869)
1955 – Albert Einstein, German-American physicist, engineer, and academic (b. 1879)
1958 – Maurice Gamelin, Belgian-French general (b. 1872)
1963 – Meyer Jacobstein, American academic and politician (b. 1880)
1964 – Ben Hecht, American director, producer, and screenwriter (b. 1894)
1965 – Guillermo González Camarena, Mexican engineer (b. 1917)
1974 – Marcel Pagnol, French author, playwright, and director (b. 1895)
1986 – Marcel Dassault, French businessman, founded Dassault Aviation (b. 1892)
1988 – Oktay Rıfat Horozcu, Turkish poet and playwright (b. 1914)
1995 – Arturo Frondizi, Argentinian lawyer and politician, 32nd President of Argentina (b. 1908)
2002 – Thor Heyerdahl, Norwegian ethnographer and explorer (b. 1914)
2004 – Kamisese Mara, Fijian politician, 2nd President of Fiji (b. 1920)
2008 – Germaine Tillion, French ethnologist and anthropologist (b. 1907)
2012 – Dick Clark, American television host and producer, founded Dick Clark Productions (b. 1929)
  2012   – René Lépine, Canadian businessman and philanthropist (b. 1929)
  2012   – Robert O. Ragland, American musician (b. 1931)
  2012   – K. D. Wentworth, American author (b. 1951)
2013 – Goran Švob, Croatian philosopher and author (b. 1947)
  2013   – Anne Williams, English activist (b. 1951)
2014 – Guru Dhanapal, Indian director and producer (b. 1959)
  2014   – Sanford Jay Frank, American screenwriter and producer (b. 1954)
  2014   – Brian Priestman, English conductor and academic (b. 1927)
2019 – Lyra McKee, Irish journalist (b. 1990)
2022 – Harrison Birtwistle, British composer (b. 1934)

Holidays and observances
 Christian feast day:
Apollonius the Apologist
Corebus
Cyril VI of Constantinople (Eastern Orthodox Church)
Eleutherius and Antia
Galdino della Sala
Molaise of Leighlin
Perfectus
April 18 (Eastern Orthodox liturgics)
Army Day (Iran)
Coma Patients' Day (Poland)
Friend's Day (Brazil)
Independence Day, (Zimbabwe)
International Day For Monuments and Sites 
Invention Day (Japan)
Victory over the Teutonic Knights in the Battle of the Ice (Russia; Julian Calendar)

References

External links

 BBC: On This Day
 
 Historical Events on April 18

Days of the year
April